The 1991 Junior League World Series took place from August 12–17 in Taylor, Michigan, United States. Spring, Texas defeated Henderson, Nevada in the championship game.

Teams

Results

References

Junior League World Series
Junior League World Series
Junior